Matt Devlin may refer to:
Matt Devlin (Irish republican) (1950–2005), member of the Provisional Irish Republican Army
Matt Devlin (sportscaster), American sportscaster & TV play-by-play announcer for the Toronto Raptors of the NBA
Matt Devlin, a fictional character on the British television drama Law & Order: UK portrayed by Jamie Bamber